Take It Like a Man is an autobiography written by English singer and songwriter Boy George. The book was published in 1995 around the same time as George's solo album Cheapness and Beauty.

References

Autobiographies
LGBT autobiographies
1995 non-fiction books
Sidgwick & Jackson books
LGBT literature in the United Kingdom